Into the Dragon is the debut studio album by Bomb the Bass, released on Rhythm King Records in 1988. It peaked at number 18 on the UK Albums Chart. It features a number of guest vocalists and three singles "Beat Dis", "Megablast/Don't Make Me Wait" and a cover version of "I Say A Little Prayer" featuring Maureen Walsh.

Track listing

Charts

References

External links
 

1988 debut albums
Bomb the Bass albums
Albums produced by Tim Simenon